Eggborough is a village and civil parish, in the Selby District of North Yorkshire, England, close to the county borders with South Yorkshire, West Yorkshire and the East Riding effectively making it the meeting point for all sides of Yorkshire. 

It is also located close to the M62. Primary age children attend Whitley and Eggborough Primary School which lies in Learning Lane on the other side of the M62.

History
Eggborough (as well as High and Low Eggborough) is mentioned in the Domesday Book of 1086 and was formerly in the Wapentake of Osgoldcross. The name derives from Ecga's Burh; a fortification which belonged to a person named Ecga. It was historically part of the West Riding of Yorkshire until 1974.

There is a pub in the village; the Horse and Jockey. There is also a sports and leisure complex based in the grounds of the nearby Eggborough Power Station. The sports and leisure complex offers a nine-hole golf course, two miniature football pitches, two full-size football pitches, a bowling green, a children's play area, a miniature railway, a licensed bar, snooker, pool, a green room and a concert hall.

The centre of the village used to be the location of a Bowman's Flour Mill, but this ceased production in 2016.

Close to Eggborough is the site of French-owned Saint-Gobain Glass, Europe's leading producer of float (flat) glass. The plant, which opened in 1998, employs over 170 people and produces  of flat glass per year.

The large village hall on Selby Road is well used by residents and it is a shared facility with the residents of Whitley Bridge who have no village hall of their own. Other activities take place at the Methodist Hall and the Westfield Centre. Although the village is situated within the boundaries of North Yorkshire, the postal address for Eggborough is "Eggborough, Near Goole, East Yorkshire". It has a DN (Doncaster, South Yorkshire) postcode and the STD telephone code is 01977 (Pontefract, West Yorkshire).

The village also has its own football team called Eggborough Eagles, which is based at the Eggborough Sports and Leisure Complex. The Eggborough Eagles was founded in 2011 by Chairman James Lancaster, Secretary Michael Corr and Manager Michael Shaughnessy. They came 4th in their first ever season recognised in the Selby and District Invitational League.

Power stations

The village was the site of the coal-fired Eggborough Power Station, built in the 1960s and once owned by British Energy. Its 4 turbines could produce a total combined output of 1960 MWe. The power station was due to be closed in 2016, but won a reprieve as a backup generator of power until March 2017 and then again until March 2018, when it shut down for good. The current owners are applying for permission to convert the power station to a gas-fired power plant.

There was also a short lived biomass power station, ARBRE Power Station, built by the Kelda Group, owners of Yorkshire Water, which cost £30 million. The site was developed to burn willow wood grown by local farmers and turn it into gas, however, by August 2002 had gone into liquidation. The capacity of the station was rated at 8 MW. In 2015, DRENL (UK) gained approval to convert the old ARBRE site into an Energy from waste (EfW) plant that would process  of waste per year to generate 10 MW of electricity.

Transport
The A19 and the A645 intersect in the village with the A19 being on a north–south axis and having a junction (number 34) on the M62 just south of the village. To the south of the village lies the Aire and Calder Navigation.

Governance
An electoral ward in the same name exists. This ward stretches north to West Haddlesey with a total population of 3,763.

It has a parish council consisting of four members. Eggborough is represented on Selby District Council by husband and wife couple John and Mary McCartney who are Independents. John is also the North Yorkshire County Councillor for the ward which includes Eggborough.

References

External links

EfW proposal leaflet

Civil parishes in North Yorkshire
Selby District
Villages in North Yorkshire